Cesare della Valle (1776/77 - 1860) was Duke of Ventignano. He is best known today as a playwright and librettist.

He wrote the libretto to Giacomo Rossini's opera Maometto II, from his own drama tragedy Anna Erizo (1820). Both were based on real-life Ottoman Sultan Mehmed II who took Negroponte from the Venetians in 1470.

That opera was completely reworked a few years later into Le siège de Corinthe (1826), but based on the same characters and story created by della Valle.

References

1776 births
1860 deaths
Librettists